Kirsten Simone Vangsness (born July 7, 1972) is an American actress and writer. She is best known for her portrayal of FBI Technical Analyst Penelope Garcia on the CBS drama series Criminal Minds. She portrayed the same character on the spin-off series Criminal Minds: Suspect Behavior, Criminal Minds: Beyond Borders.

Early life
Vangsness was born in Pasadena, California, daughter of Errol Leroy Vangsness, of Norwegian descent, and wife Barbara Mary (née Marconi), of Italian descent. She was raised in Porterville, California, and later moved to Cerritos, California. She graduated from Cerritos High School in June 1990 and attended Cypress College in Cypress, California. She later graduated from California State University, Fullerton in 1996.

Career

Acting
Vangsness became involved in acting as a child to help overcome shyness and got her first big break in the theatre, where she won several awards, including the 15 Minutes of Female Best Actress Award, the Los Angeles Drama Critics Award for Best Emerging Comic Actress, and the Golden Betty Award.

Writing
Vangsness' work has been published in the Los Angeles Times. Since 2014, Vangsness has co-written four episodes of Criminal Minds. In 2014 she co-wrote "Nelson's Sparrow" with executive producer, Erica Messer. In 2015 she co-wrote "A Beautiful Disaster" once again with Messer and in 2016 she co-wrote "Spencer" with Messer. The Criminal Minds series finale was also co-written by Vangsness and Messer.

Personal life 
In a 2011 interview, Vangsness has described herself as "as queer as a purple unicorn singing Madonna". She was in a seven-year relationship with editor Melanie Goldstein, to whom she was engaged, until 2013. 

In 2015 she announced her engagement to Keith Hansen.  Though she has been engaged to both a man and a woman, Vangsness says she doesn't identify as bisexual. "...If I were straight, I would say I was, but I don't totally understand it myself. I don't want to have an answer to something that I don't really have an answer to."

Filmography

Film

Television

References

External links 

 

Living people
1972 births
20th-century American actresses
21st-century American actresses
American television actresses
American people of Norwegian descent
American people of Italian descent
LGBT people from California
People from Cerritos, California
Queer women
American queer actresses
Queer writers